Gwanghuimun  (Hangul 광희문, Hanja 光熙門; also known as Southeast Gate)  is one of The Eight Gates of Seoul in the Fortress Wall of Seoul, South Korea, which surrounded the city in the Joseon Dynasty. The gate is also known as Namsomun (남소문,  “South Small Gate”). It was originally called Sugumun "Water Channel Gate."

History

Gwanghuimun was originally built in 1396, and was rebuilt from 1711-1719. It was the only gate to be left virtually untouched during the Japanese Occupation. However, it was largely destroyed during the Korean War, but was restored in 1976.

The name Gwanghuimun means literally “Bright Light Gate.”

The Gate today

Gwanghuimun is located in Jung-gu, Gwanghui-dong 2-ga, Seoul, at the intersection of Geumhodong-gil and Toegye-ro. The current gate is located slightly further south than the original gate, due to road construction.

The gate can be easily accessed from the Dongdaemun History & Culture Park Station, which is located on both subway line 2 and subway line 4. It is located about 1/2 block south from subway line 2, exit 3; and about 2 1/2 blocks east from subway line 4, exit 4. Visitors to the gate today are not allowed access above the gate, but can go through the gate and circle the section of the Fortress Wall it is connected to.

Gallery

References 

Gates in Korea
Gates in South Korea
Buildings and structures in Seoul
History of Seoul
Rebuilt buildings and structures in South Korea